Ildar Ildusovich Dadin (born April 14, 1982) is a Russian activist, accused of violent acts and derailing during demonstrations and hence constantly receiving increased attention from the authority. He is the first person to spend 1 year in a penal colony solely for his activity.

Activism and imprisonment
According to Amnesty International, Ildar Dadin is a "peaceful opposition activist". Dadin has attended rallies in support of the LGBT community (he is not LGBT himself) and opposition figurehead Alexei Navalny, has been seen holding a banner saying "Putin is an enemy of the people" at anti-government protests, and has also taken part in a pro-Maidan protest, the Peace March.

Dadin was arrested December 3, 2015. He was sentenced to three years in jail by a Moscow court for repeated anti-government street protests.

Between August 2014 and January 2015 Dadin was accused of taking part in four one-person pickets on Aug 6, Aug 23, Sept 13 and Dec 5 2014. According to Russian law, individual protests do not need authorisation. The criminal case was triggered by his participation on Jan 15 2015 in action supporting Alexei Navalny and his brother Oleg in Moscow’s Manezhnaya Square. Dadin was sentenced to 15 days jail for “disobeying the lawful demands of the police”.

Before addition Article 212.1 to Russia’s Criminal Code in July 2014 Dadin could be sentenced to pay fine or a suspended prison term. But according to the new Article 212.1, if a court has issued two rulings on administrative offences within 180 days the law opens up a sentence of up to 5 years in a prison colony. This was the decision taken by the Basmanny Court in Moscow and which condemned Dadin to three years in prison. The prosecutor had asked for a shorter sentence of two years.

The punishment was later reduced to 2.5 years. Dadin was not allowed to be in the court during the appeal case.

He is the first person to be jailed using the law, which was introduced in 2014 and punishes repeated breaches of public assembly rules.

Dadin was sent to the prison and labor camp of Segezha.  He claimed to catching mice in his prison cell, with 8 beds for the 11 inmates.

Ildar Dadin is accusing the prison of using torture. He describes being hit and beaten by 10 to 12 prison employees at the same time, several times per day, for several days, and later having his head being forced down into a toilet.    Dadin also said that prison workers had hung him by his handcuffs for half an hour and pulled his underwear down, threatening him with rape if he refused to stop a hunger strike he had begun after being deprived of basic necessities such as soap and toilet paper.

The prison has confirmed use of force.

Kremlin spokesman Dmitry Peskov has said that the case merited "the closest attention" and that President Vladimir Putin would be informed.

Russia’s human rights ombudsman Ella Pamfilova has criticized the excessive severity of the punishment, promising to send a request to the Constitutional Court.  The Presidential Human Rights Council has demanded the withdrawal of the article used to imprison Dadin from the Criminal Code.

In 2017 the Supreme Court ordered that Dadin should be freed, and he was released from prison on 26 February. The penial colony directorate has issued official apology to Dadin and on 31 Mai 2017 the court has agreed to fulfill the lawsuit in favor of Dadin, paying him 2 million rubles (~ $35,000) for unlawful criminal prosecution.

See also 
 Freedom of assembly in Russia
 Human rights in Russia

References 

1982 births
Amnesty International prisoners of conscience held by Russia
Russian dissidents
Living people
Russian LGBT rights activists
Russian prisoners and detainees
Tatar people of Russia
Political prisoners according to Memorial